Ceratoxancus is a genus of sea snails, marine gastropod mollusks in the family Costellariidae.

Species
Species within the genus Ceratoxancus include:
 Ceratoxancus basileus Kantor & Bouchet, 1997
 Ceratoxancus elongatus Sakurai, 1958
 Ceratoxancus leios Kantor & Bouchet, 1997
 Ceratoxancus lorenzi Poppe, Tagaro & Sarino, 2012
 Ceratoxancus melichrous Kantor & Bouchet, 1997
 Ceratoxancus niveus Kantor & Bouchet, 1997
 Ceratoxancus teramachii Kuroda, 1952

Classification
Biota > Animalia (Kingdom) > Mollusca (Phylum) > Gastropoda (Class) > Caenogastropoda (Subclass) > Neogastropoda (Order) > Turbinelloidea (Superfamily) > Costellariidae (Family) > Ceratoxancus (Genus)

References

  Kantor Yu.I., Bouchet Ph., 1997a. The anatomy and systematics of Ceratoxancus, a genus of deep-water Ptychatractinae (Gastropoda: Turbinellidae) with labral spine. Veliger, 40(2): 101-120

External links
 Fedosov A.E., Puillandre N., Herrmann M., Dgebuadze P. & Bouchet P. (2017). Phylogeny, systematics, and evolution of the family Costellariidae (Gastropoda: Neogastropoda). Zoological Journal of the Linnean Society. 179(3): 541-626

Costellariidae
Gastropod genera